Narceus gordanus is a spirobolid millipede native to the southeastern United States. Common names include Smokey Oak Millipede and Smokey Ghost Millipede. The body color is lighter than other species of Narceus, with each body ring a light greenish tan followed by a band of darker tan. N. gordanus also has shorter legs than other Narceus species, and a deeper groove on the head in which the antennae rest.

Narceus gordanus occurs in Florida scrub habitat of peninsular Florida, and ranges as far north as South Carolina, with possible records in Tennessee. N. gordanus matches the color of sand in some Florida habitats, even though it is mainly active at night. Narceus gordanus, similar to other millipedes, responds to threats by secreting a foul-smelling and tasting fluid and coiling into a defensive spiral to protect its underbelly and head. When exposed to human skin, these secretions can cause a harmless discoloration known as millipede burn. Their diet consists of decaying leaves, wood, and other detritus.

Photos

References

Millipedes of North America
Spirobolida
Animals described in 1943
Fauna of the Southeastern United States